Rogue of the Range is a 1936 American Western film directed by S. Roy Luby and starring Johnny Mack Brown and Lois January. The picture is also known as Spider and the Fly in the United Kingdom.

Cast 
Johnny Mack Brown as Dan Doran
Lois January as Stella Lamb
Stephen Chase as Lige Branscomb
Phyllis Hume as Tess
George Ball as Jim Mitchell
Jack Rockwell as Henchman Sloan
Horace Murphy as Sheriff Tom
Frank Ball as John (express agent)
Oscar Gahan as Stage guard

External links 

 
 

1936 films
1936 Western (genre) films
American Western (genre) films
American black-and-white films
Films directed by S. Roy Luby
1930s English-language films
1930s American films